Malte Fynboe Manniche Ebert (born june 26, 1994), better known by his former nickname Gulddreng, is a Danish musician. His identity was unknown until the father of his host family from an exchange trip announced his name on Facebook. His name translates to "gold boy" or "golden boy" in English. As Gulddreng, Ebert was known for always wearing sunglasses, which helped to obscure his identity. His first seven singles, "Model", "Se mig nu", "Hva' så", "Drikker for lidt", "Nemt", "Guld jul" and "Ked af det", all peaked at number 1 in Denmark, with "Se mig nu", "Drikker for lidt", "Guld jul", and "Ked af det" debuting at the top spot.

On September 7, 2016, Ebert as Gulddreng also released his own official app on the App Store. The app was developed by Thorwest Development.

In September 2017, Ebert stopped using the nickname Gulddreng and began using his real name, Malte Ebert. He said he created the nickname as a "reaction to bad pop music". In June 2018, he released "Rather Be", his first single as Malte Ebert. In May 2019, he played his first concert in Vega. In 2019, he also went to Los Angeles to make songs with more international sound.

Discography

Album

Singles

References

Danish rappers
Living people
Year of birth uncertain
People from Vejle Municipality
1994 births